Lathar was a daughter of Úgaine Mór, a High King of Ireland during pre-Christian times.  Ugaine reputedly gave Lathar a stretch of land along the coast of County Antrim, from Glenarm to the Inver; which would one day make Larne.

References

History of Northern Ireland
Irish princesses
5th-century BC women
Ancient princesses